François Rabbath (born 1931 in Aleppo, Syria) is a contemporary French double-bass virtuoso, soloist, and composer.

Career
He was born into a Syrian family of musicians but his only instruction came from a book written by a Parisian bassist Edouard Nanny. In 1955 he went to Paris, hoping to meet Nanny, who had died nearly ten years prior to his arrival, but he continued to study, and in 1964 recorded for the first time.

He is a virtuoso player, and he has inspired a large cadre of bassists from disparate musical genres and continues to travel the world as a soloist and clinician.

In 1977 Rabbath began a collaboration with American composer Frank Proto. Proto has written five major works for double bass and orchestra especially for Rabbath who has premiered and recorded them all. Included are two of the most often-performed works in the double bass repertoire: A Carmen Fantasy and Nine Variants on Paganini. both for Double Bass and Orchestra.

Rabbath's major contribution to the field of bass pedagogy is represented in the three-volume Nouvelle technique de la contrebasse. The main differences in Rabbath's approach from that of the double bass method of Franz Simandl is Rabbath's use of the left hand and his detailed attention to the bow arm. In Simandl's system, first position (below thumb position) encompasses only a whole step. In Rabbath's method, the entire fingerboard is divided into only six positions, defined by the location of natural harmonics on the strings. Playing the bass with six positions is possible by using a technique called pivoting.

Pivots are often mistakenly called extensions or shifts. An extension is a widening of the hand to reach a new note (as outlined by Zimmermann). A pivot is a rocking of the hand to reach a new note where the thumb remains stationary but all fingers gain the technical freedom to move anywhere else possible/required. Pivots thus enable the fusing of several different positions at once.

By placing the thumb in an appropriate place and just rocking the hand back and forth the player can use for example Simandl's half, 1st, and 2nd positions without the need for shifts. Usually, the thumb should be relatively behind the index finger or closer to the middle finger (when not in thumb position) so the bassist can fully utilize the weight of the left arm and have a very free pivot. The reason a pivot is not a shift is because the thumb does not move either on the string or behind the neck. A shift requires that the whole hand moves and results in a change of position.

Another technique used by Francois Rabbath is the Crab Technique, named for the way the hand
movement resembles a crab's sideways walking. The technique is outlined in the third volume of the Rabbath Method and allows for part of the hand to move while the other part remains and vice versa – in this way the hand can move up and down the string in certain passages without ever fully shifting. Rabbath is not the first person to use the Crab Technique but he is the first double bassist to name it and give it a thorough full technical exploration.

For example, similar exercises are found on the first page of Franco Petracchi's Simplifed Higher Technique. Some small examples can be found in method books such as Simandl, but it is a point of contention whether these were intended as crabs or shifts as they do not contain textual explanations.

Notable students and associates
 John Clayton
 Paul Ellison
 Renaud Garcia-Fons
 Rufus Reid
 Hal Robinson
George Vance

References

External links 
 François Rabbath's U.S. web page
 François Rabbath's Printed Music Editions
 François Rabbath's Recordings

1931 births
Living people
French composers
French male composers
Classical double-bassists
21st-century double-bassists
21st-century French male musicians